Allium decaisnei is a species of onion found in Israel, Palestine, Jordan, and the Sinai Peninsula in Egypt. It is a perennial with an upright scape. Umbel is loose, with long-pediceled green flowers, most of them nodding (drooping).

Some authorities categorize this taxon as a subspecies of A. stamineum, with others consider the name a synonym of A. flavum.

References

decaisnei
Flora of Palestine (region)
Flora of Israel
Flora of Jordan
Flora of Egypt
Plants described in 1845
Taxa named by Carl Borivoj Presl